The 1920 West Virginia gubernatorial election took place on November 2, 1920, to elect the governor of West Virginia. Adam Brown Littlepage unsuccessfully ran for the Democratic nomination.

Results

References

1920
gubernatorial
West Virginia
November 1920 events in the United States